Stephen IV of Moldavia, also called Ștefăniță (1506 – 14 January 1527) was Prince of Moldavia from 1517 to 1527. He succeeded to the throne as son of the previous ruler, Bogdan III cel Chior. Until 1523, he was under the regency of Luca Arbore, Gatekeeper of Suceava. He was the father of John III the Terrible.

Rulers of Moldavia
16th-century monarchs in Europe
House of Bogdan-Mușat